Negros Occidental's 4th congressional district is one of the six congressional districts of the Philippines in the province of Negros Occidental. It has been represented in the House of Representatives since 1987. The district consists of the area in north-central Negros Occidental immediately to the south of the capital city of Bacolod. It contains the cities of Bago and La Carlota, and the municipalities of Pontevedra, Pulupandan, San Enrique and Valladolid. It is currently represented in the 18th Congress by Juliet Marie Ferrer of the National Unity Party (NUP).

Representation history

Election results

2022

2019

2016

2013

2010

See also
Legislative districts of Negros Occidental

References

Congressional districts of the Philippines
Politics of Negros Occidental
1987 establishments in the Philippines
Congressional districts of Western Visayas
Constituencies established in 1987